The 2013 Kehoe Cup, known for sponsorship reasons as the Bord na Móna Kehoe Cup, was an inter-county and colleges hurling competition in Ireland. The competition was ranked below the Walsh Cup and featured second- and third-tier counties and colleges from Leinster, Ulster and Connacht.

Format

14 teams compete in a straight knockout tournament. Drawn games go to extra time; if drawn after extra time, a replay is played.

The 6 teams that lose in the first round go into the Kehoe Shield, which is also a straight knockout tournament.

Teams
County teams: (9)
Armagh
Fingal
Derry
Down
Kildare
Louth
Meath
Roscommon
Wicklow

Third level: (5)

Dublin City University (DCU)
Galway-Mayo Institute of Technology (GMIT)
Queen's University Belfast (QUB)
St Patrick's College, Drumcondra
Trinity College Dublin

Results

Final

Kehoe Shield

Final

References

Kehoe Cup
Kehoe Cup